Pierre Louis Eugène Adam (24 April 1924 – 24 September 2012) was a French cyclist. He was born in Paris. He won a gold medal in the team pursuit at the 1948 Summer Olympics in London, together with Fernand Decanali, Charles Coste and Serge Blusson.

References

External links
 

1924 births
2012 deaths
Cyclists from Paris
French male cyclists
Cyclists at the 1948 Summer Olympics
Olympic cyclists of France
Olympic gold medalists for France
Olympic medalists in cycling
Medalists at the 1948 Summer Olympics
French track cyclists